Marian A. Wohlwender [Fricker] (March 13, 1922 - December 17, 2011) was catcher who played for the Kenosha Comets of the All-American Girls Professional Baseball League in 1943. She batted and threw right-handed. Her nickname was Wooly. She died in Fort Myers, Florida.

References

1922 births
2011 deaths
All-American Girls Professional Baseball League players
Baseball players from Cincinnati
21st-century American women